Libermann is a surname. Notable people with the surname include:

Alexander Libermann (1896–1978), American classical pianist
Francis Libermann (1802–1852), French Roman Catholic priest
Paulette Libermann (1919-2007), French mathematician

Schools with that name include:
 Francis Libermann Catholic High School

See also
Liebermann

Jewish surnames
Yiddish-language surnames